Florentino Mendes Pereira (born 4 February 1969) is a Bissau-Guinean politician and former of Minister of Energy and Industry.

References 

Bissau-Guinean politicians
1969 births
Living people
Party for Social Renewal politicians
People from Cacheu Region